Ceryx mirabilis is a moth of the subfamily Arctiinae. It was described by Peter Smetacek in 2010. It is found in India.

The length of the forewings is about 11 mm. The forewings and hindwings are hyaline (glass like).

Etymology
The species name is derived from Latin mirabilis (meaning wonderful).

References

Ceryx (moth)
Moths described in 2010